Pakistan Naval Station Makran, known as PNS Makran formerly known as Coastal Naval Air Station, Pasni, is a Naval air station and a military airport located in Coastal city of Pasni of Balochistan. It is one of the two active Naval Air Arm's bases (other one being PNS Mehran) and is currently headquarters to the Pakistan Navy's Alouette III and Lynx helicopters.

The military site consists of 968 acres of airfield plus 15 acres of land is located Gorani, also owned by the Navy.

History 
Pasni is a coastal town of Balochistan which is located about 210 km west of Karachi. More than 50% inhabitants are traditionally fishermen while others are local villagers. Work began in 1986 on the construction of the site, with the temporary runway completed in 1988. In 2003, the base was connected with the National Highway Number 10, a highway that connects Karachi, Sindh to Gwadar, Balochistan. Previously known as Coastal Naval Air Station (CNAS), the Navy's e Naval Observer School was first moved there, with the Naval Search and Rescue Squadron soon following. The construction of site was undertaken by the Corps of Engineers, Military Engineering Service and the Naval Engineering Branch as its contractors. On 23 October 1988, Chief of Naval Staff, later Chairman of Joint Chiefs of Staff Committee, Admiral Iftikhar Ahmed Sirohey visited the naval air station in 1988. The same day, it was given commissioned in the Naval services of Pakistan Navy as PNS Makran. The facility was later upgraded in between 2001 and 2003 when the base was connected to Makran Coastal Highway.

In June 2010, Fokker F-27, Alouette III and Lynx from PNS Mehran were deployed to PNS Makran on Operation Madad. The PNS Makran is a main naval air station to support the naval air operations in Balochistan as well as it performs numbers of reconnaissance operation for Southern Naval Command (SNC).

Current operations 

The PNS Makran currently operations Fokker F-27, Alouette III and Lynx which are deployed from PNS Mehran to support relief and humanitarian operations in a recent and Country's worst deluge. As of today, the base is current the main headquarters of Navy's relief operations where the naval air squadron's are continued to take sorties to evacuate stranded people in flood affected areas.

To this facility may also belong a 2016 completed VLF transmission facility near Turbat.

References

External Billets
PNS Makran - Official Site
PNS Makran - Oldsite

Makran
Makran